The Order of the Second of May (in Spanish: Orden del Dos de Mayo) is the highest distinction granted by the Community of Madrid. It has three degrees: Grand Cross, Commandery of Number and Cross, according to pre-eminence. In the case of legal persons, the decoration takes the form of a Badge of Honor. It is regulated by decree 91/2006, of November 2.

References list 

Medals